Jesse Green (born Locksley Alphonso Green, 5 July 1948) is a Jamaican reggae and disco musician.

He was born in the parish of St. James, Jamaica. As a young boy, Green attended Denham Town Primary School and became fascinated with music by listening to the sound systems, particularly the one belonging to Count Barrett.

Green was a member of the Pioneers and drummed with Jimmy Cliff in the 1970s, recording singles such as "Locks Lee", before launching a solo career in 1976. He scored an international disco hit with a remix of his "Nice and Slow", and also scored several other minor hits in the US and the UK.

Discography

Studio albums
 Nice and Slow (EMI, 1976)
 Come with Me (EMI, 1978)
 1, 2, 3 Let's Go (Milan, 1981)
 Monopoly (Milan, 1982)
 Roundtrip with Jesse Green (Rapport Music, 1991)
 + Skazzmatic (Slinkaboo, 2009)

Singles

References

External links

1948 births
Living people
Jamaican reggae singers
Jamaican male singers
Disco musicians